Four Seasons is an album by vibraphonist Bobby Hutcherson, pianist George Cables, bassist Herbie Lewis and drummer Philly Joe Jones featuring performances recorded in 1983 and originally given limited release in 1984 in Japan on Baystate as Nice Groove before  being more widely released the following year on the Dutch Timeless label.

Reception

On Allmusic, Scott Yanow observed "This set by vibraphonist Bobby Hutcherson is a bit unusual in that, rather than playing complex originals, he interprets seven jazz standards. ... Hutcherson sounds in top form".

Track listing
 "I Mean You" (Thelonious Monk) – 5:49
 "All of You" (Cole Porter) – 5:54
 "Spring Is Here" (Richard Rodgers, Lorenz Hart) – 7:03
 "Star Eyes" (Don Raye, Gene de Paul) – 7:47
 "If I Were a Bell" (Frank Loesser) – 5:37
 "Summertime" (George Gershwin, DuBose Heyward) – 6:50
 "Autumn Leaves" (Joseph Kosma, Jacques Prévert, Johnny Mercer) – 6:36

Personnel
Bobby Hutcherson – vibraphone
George Cables - piano
Herbie Lewis – bass
Philly Joe Jones – drums

References

Timeless Records albums
Bobby Hutcherson albums
1985 albums